Ynys Feurig, Cemlyn Bay and The Skerries Special Protection Area, also known as the (North) Anglesey tern colonies, is a Special Protection Area covering three sites in Anglesey, North Wales which support breeding terns:

 Ynys Feurig
 Cemlyn Bay and lagoon
 The Skerries

All three sites have been notified as Sites of Special Scientific Interest.

References

Special Protection Areas in Wales
Nature reserves in Anglesey